Graptopsaltria is a genus of cicadas from East Asia.

List of species
 Graptopsaltria bimaculata Kato, 1925
 Graptopsaltria colorata Stål, 1866
  Graptopsaltria inaba Fujiyama, 1982
 Graptopsaltria nigrofuscata (Motschulsky, 1866)
 Graptopsaltria tienta Karsch, 1894

References

Fauna of East Asia
Taxa named by Carl Stål
Polyneurini
Cicadidae genera